Cheqa Vaqfi (also Romanized as Cheqā Vaqfī) is a village in Pishkuh-e Zalaqi Rural District, Besharat District, Aligudarz County, Lorestan Province, Iran. At the 2006 census, its population was 58, in 10 families.

References 

Towns and villages in Aligudarz County